Tomorrow Never Comes is a 1978 British-Canadian crime film directed by Peter Collinson and starring Oliver Reed and Susan George.

Tomorrow Never Comes may also refer to:

Albums
Tomorrow Never Comes (album), a 1970 album by Slim Whitman
Tomorrow Never Comes, the soundtrack to the film by Roy Budd 
Tomorrow Never Comes – Anthology 69–06, by Magna Carta

Songs
"Tomorrow Never Comes" (song), a 1945 song by Ernest Tubb
"Tomorrow Never Comes", a 1957 single by Billy "The Kid" Emerson
"Tomorrow Never Comes", a song by Dot Allison, from a 1999 episode of La Femme Nikita
"Tomorrow Never Comes", a song by the Zac Brown Bandfrom the album Jekyll + Hyde

See also
"If Tomorrow Never Comes", song by Garth Brooks